Perserikatan Sepakbola Indonesia Mataram, commonly known as PSIM, is a professional football club based in Yogyakarta, Indonesia. Their home stadium is the Mandala Krida Stadium. They play in Liga 2.

History 
The history of the founding of PSIM began on September 5, 1929 with the birth of a football organization called the Perserikatan Sepak Raga Mataram (PSM). The name Mataram was used because Yogyakarta was the center of the Mataram Kingdom. Then on July 27, 1930 the name PSM was changed to the Perserikatan Sepakbola Indonesia Mataram (PSIM) as a demand for the national movement to achieve Indonesian independence. At that time it was actually an agency for the struggle of the Indonesian nation and state.

On 19 April 1930, PSIM together with VIJ Jakarta (now Persija Jakarta), BIVB Bandung (Persib Bandung), MIVB (PPSM Magelang), MVB (PSM Madiun), SIVB (Persebaya Surabaya), VVB (Persis Solo) also attended the establishment PSSI in a meeting held at Societeit Hadiprojo Yogyakarta. in the meeting represented by HA Hamid, Daslam, and Amir Noto. After going through various meetings, it was finally agreed to establish a parent organization named PSSI Persatuan Sepak Raga Seluruh Indonesia in 1931 and take place in Yogyakarta.

In the 70s, PSIM could not do much at the level of the main competition, but PSIM had achieved an achievement, namely having scored the only goal against a semi-professional club from Australia who was on a tour to Indonesia, the goal of PSIM was scored by Sucipto, one of the players. PSIM who participated in Diklat Salatiga and along with other players, Suripto, even though at the end of the match PSIM lost 1–5. Another achievement was when they defeated the Indonesia national team which was managed by coach Marota Yanek from Poland in a friendly match at the Kridosono Stadium, the final result of the match 1–0 for PSIM wins.

Since the Indonesian league started in 1994, PSIM's achievements have experienced ups and downs marked by the ups and downs of PSIM from the main division to division 1 of the Indonesian League. PSIM experienced relegation in the 1994–95 Liga Indonesia Premier Division and promoted two years later. After competing for three seasons in the premier division, PSIM again had to be relegated to Liga Indonesia First Division in the 1999–2000 Liga Indonesia Premier Division.

Three years later, in Division 1 Liga Indonesia 2003 PSIM began to rise again and has a target for promotion with a well-prepared team. In the preliminary round, PSIM even beat the favorite team Persebaya Surabaya twice in away matches with a landslide score of 3–1, and 3–0, and won Group C. However, PSIM's strength was getting worse and worse so that it failed to continue its dominance in the last 8 round. take place in full competition. PSIM, which had led the standings from the start, had to settle for being in 4th place, and had the opportunity to participate in the playoffs. In the playoffs played in Solo, PSIM was unable to compete with Persela Lamongan only because of the difference in the number of goals.

in 2005, they qualified for the highest caste 2006 Liga Indonesia Premier Division of the Indonesian league after the Division 1 champions who in the final match beat Persiwa Wamena at the Jalak Harupat Stadium with a score of 2–1. in 2010 PSIM increasingly existed in the national football scene with increasing achievements and finally starting the 2011–2012 competition, PSIM has become a professional team that no longer relies on funds from the APBD.

Seasons

Players

Current squad

Naturalized players

Out on loan

Coaching Staff

Honours 
 Liga Indonesia First Division
 Winners (1): 2005
 Runner-up (1): 1997
 Perserikatan
 Winners (1): 1932
 Runner-up (4): 1931, 1939, 1940, 1943

References

External links

  Official Site of PSIM Yogyakarta Supporters/Brajamusti
  Official Site of PSIM Yogyakarta
  Site of PSIM fans outside Yogjakarta
  Ultras Mataram PSIM Jogja Supporters
  MARKAS-MATARAM ON KASKUS PSIM Fans
  Facebook PSIM Fanspage

Sport in Yogyakarta
PSIM Yogyakarta
Football clubs in Indonesia
Football clubs in the Special Region of Yogyakarta
Association football clubs established in 1929
1929 establishments in the Dutch East Indies